Remembrance is an album from jazz drummer Elvin Jones, recorded on February 3, 4 and 5, 1978 and released on MPS Records in 1978.

Track listing
All songs written by Pat LaBarbera, except where noted
Side one
"Giraffe" (Don Garcia)  –  7:54
"Section 8"  –  4:25
"Little Lady"  –  6:27
"Familiar Ground"  –  3:32
Side two
"Kalima" (Michael Stuart)  –  8:30
"Beatrice" (Andy McCloud III)  –  6:41
"Remembrance"  –  7:04

Personnel
drums - Elvin Jones
tenor saxophone and soprano - Pat LaBarbera
tenor saxophone and soprano - Michael Stuart
guitar - Roland Prince
bass - Andy McCloud III

Credits
Producer - Joachim-Ernst Berendt
Engineer - Gibbs Platen

References

1978 albums
Elvin Jones albums
MPS Records albums